The Alliance of Patriotic Forces (AFP) was a political alliance in Guinea-Bissau. It consisted of the Union for Change (UM), Guinean Civic Forum-Social Democracy (FCG-SD), the Democratic Social Front (FDS) and the Solidarity and Labour Party (PST).

History
The Alliance was formed in September 2008 in order to contest the November 2008 parliamentary elections. However, it received just 1.3% of the vote and failed to win a seat.

It supported Manuel Serifo Nhamadjo in the March 2012 presidential elections. Nhamadjo finished third with 16% of the vote. Following the April 2012 coup the FCG-SD and the FDS joined the pro-coup Opposition Democratic Forum, whilst the PST joined the National Anti-Coup Front.

References

Political party alliances in Guinea-Bissau
Political parties established in 2008
Political parties disestablished in 2012
2008 establishments in Guinea-Bissau
2012 disestablishments in Guinea-Bissau
Defunct political parties in Guinea-Bissau